Ultimate Comics: Iron Man is a comic book limited series published by Marvel Comics that began in October 2012 and ran until January 2013 as part of Marvel's "Ultimate Comics" imprint, based on the Ultimate universe version of Iron Man.  The series is written by Nathan Edmondson with art by Matteo Buffagni. The series features the debut of the Ultimate Mandarin, which here is an organisation rather than a lone supervillain.

See also
 Ultimate Comics: Armor Wars
 Ultimate Comics: Ultimates

References

Iron Man